The Fox Fans League was launched in 2015 to find the best player of FIFA 15 on PlayStation 4 in Australia.

2015 National Finals

Round of 16 Results

Quarter-final Results

Semi-final Results

Grand-Final Result

It's unclear who any of the remaining 5 players represented. The only remaining clubs from the A-League not known to be represented above are Brisbane Roar, Newcastle Jets, Perth Glory, & Wellington Phoenix

Notes

References

External links

2015 in Australian sport
2015 establishments in Australia
Sports leagues established in 2015
A-League Men
Esports leagues
FIFA (video game series) competitions
Fox Sports (Australian TV network) original programming